Coiled coil domain containing protein 120 (CCDC120), also known as JM11 protein, is a protein that, in humans, is encoded by the CCDC120 gene. The function of CCDC120 has not been formally identified but structural components, conservation, and interactions can be identified computationally.

Gene 

The CCDC120 gene is located on human chromosome X, at Xp11.23. There are six different transcript variants of CCDC120 produced by alternative splicing.

Patterns 

The mRNA transcript of CCDC120 contains a 120bp repeat near the 3' end.

Homology

Paralogs 

CCDC120 has 3 identifiable paralogs in humans, FERM Domain Containing 4A, FERM domain Containing 4B, and C1orf106.

Orthologs 

The orthologous space of CCDC120 can be traced back as far as fish such as Danio rerio, Oryzias latipes, and Dicentrarchus labrax.

Protein 

The CCDC120 protein has four different isoforms, ranging from 618 to 696 amino acids in length.   Isoform 1 is the longest isoform and is encoded by transcript 1 of the CCDC120 gene.

Interactions 

Usher Syndrome 1C Binding Protein 1, CYTH2, MDFI, Centrosomal Protein 170kDa Pseudogene 1, and Keratin 15 have all been shown experimentally to interact with CCDC120  Other interactions have been identified by coexpression and datamining and can be seen in the figure.

Post-translational modification 

Algorithms suggest a number of sites of Serine phosphorylation as well as a few sites of Threonine and Tyrosine phosphorylation. Many of these sites are conserved in Gorilla gorilla gorilla, Mus musculus, and Danio rerio. There is one potential N-Glycosylation site identified.

Structure 

The protein structure of CCDC120 is predicted to contain, as the name implies, a 65 amino acid coiled coil from positions 109-173. Multiple algorithms identify 3 distinct sites where alpha-helical structures could form which are conserved in Gorilla gorilla gorilla and Danio rerio. Algorithms do not agree on any location for a beta sheet structure.

Expression

Promoter 

Algorithms suggest that CCDC120 has a promoter of 601bp, this promoter contains a number of possible transcription factor sites as shown in the figure.

References in Scientific Literature 

CCDC120 was found to be upregulated under pulsed electromagnetic fields in human osteoblastlike cells. CCDC120 has a 7 base deletion in a Metastatic
Olfactory Neuroblastoma. CCDC120 is downregulated after neonatal hypoxic-ischemic brain injury in rats.

References